The 1922–23 Army Cadets men's basketball team represented the United States Military Academy (known as "Army" for their sports teams) during the 1922–23 intercollegiate basketball season in the United States. The team finished the season with a 17–0 record and was retroactively named the national champion by the Premo-Porretta Power Poll. It was head coach Harry Fisher's second season coaching the team.

References

Army Black Knights men's basketball seasons
NCAA Division I men's basketball tournament championship seasons
Army
Army Cadets Men's Basketball Team
Army Cadets Men's Basketball Team